Glazovo is a rural locality (a village) in Sergeikhinskoye Rural Settlement, Kameshkovsky District, Vladimir Oblast, Russia. The population was 7 as of 2010.

Geography 
Glazovo is located on the Pechuga River, 23 km northwest of Kameshkovo (the district's administrative centre) by road. Krutovo is the nearest rural locality.

References 

Rural localities in Kameshkovsky District